Centro Iberico, London, in the 1970s was a Spanish anarchist support centre, which after moving into a squatted school building in Notting Hill, London became a self-managed social centre, a live venue and a studio.

Origins
Centro Iberico was initially established at Chalk Farm early in the 1970s by Spanish Civil War veterans, principal among them Miguel García García, twenty years a prisoner of Franco. Garcia and his comrades were active in the prisoner-aid group, the Anarchist Black Cross.  Later, when also known as the Anarchy or Alternative ‘A’ Centre, it met in a parish hall in Holborn, before moving in 1982 to the school building, 421 Harrow Road, Notting Hill.    Its original political activity would have wound down following the restoration of parliamentary government in Spain, and Garcia's death in 1981.

Bands

The centre in Notting Hill put on anarcho-punk gigs by the Mob, Conflict, Poison Girls and the Subhumans. Throbbing Gristle played and recorded at the centre. Future Madonna producer William Orbit began his recording career and Guerilla Records whilst living there.

See also
Wapping Autonomy Centre

References

Social centres in the United Kingdom
DIY culture
Anarchist movements
Information centres
Underground culture
British culture
History of subcultures
Counterculture
Former squats
Squats in the United Kingdom
William Orbit
Anarcho-punk venues
Infoshops
Social centres